There are hundreds of Armenian churches in Turkey, the majority of which are either in ruins or are being used for other purposes. Armenian churches still in active use belonging to various denominations, mainly Armenian Apostolic, but also Armenian Catholic and Armenian Evangelical Protestant.

Armenian Apostolic Churches

Old İstanbul

European side of İstanbul

Anatolian side of İstanbul

Prince Islands

Anatolia

Armenian Catholic Churches

Armenian Evangelical Churches

References 

 
Turkey, Armenian
Lists of religious buildings and structures in Turkey
Oriental Orthodoxy-related lists
Eastern Catholicism-related lists
Active churches in Turkey